Hydraecia is a genus of moths of the family Noctuidae.

Species
The genus includes the following species:

 Hydraecia arnymai (Dyar, 1913)
 Hydraecia burkhana (Alphéraky, 1892)
 Hydraecia franzhoferi Gyulai, L. Ronkay & Saldaitis, 2011
 Hydraecia immanis Guenée, 1852
 Hydraecia intermedia (Barnes & Benjamin, 1924)
 Hydraecia lampadifera Walker, 1865
 Hydraecia medialis Smith, 1892
 Hydraecia micacea – Rosy Rustic (Esper, 1789)
 Hydraecia mongoliensis Urbahn, 1967
 Hydraecia naxiaoides Moore, 1867
 Hydraecia nordstroemi Horke, 1952
 Hydraecia obliqua (Harvey, 1876)
 Hydraecia osseola Staudinger, 1882
 Hydraecia perobliqua Hampson, 1910
 Hydraecia petasitis – Butterbur Doubleday, 1847
 Hydraecia songariae (Alphéraky, 1882)
 Hydraecia stramentosa Guenée, 1852
 Hydraecia terminata Varga & Ronkay, 1991
 Hydraecia ultima Holst, 1965

References
 , 2011: New Noctuidae species from China and the Himalayas (Lepidoptera: Noctuoidea). Esperiana Buchreihe zur Entomologie 16: 166-197.
 , 2010: An illustrated catalogue of primary type specimens of the Lepidoptera in collection of the Zoological Museum of Moscow State University described in the second half of XXth century. Eversmannia 21/22: 6-27.
 , 2005: Apameini Noctuidae Europaea Volume 8: 323 pp.

External links
 Hydraecia at funet.fi
 Natural History Museum Lepidoptera genus database

Apameini